David Raskin (June 15, 1943 – August 16, 2022), who performed as Kal David, was an American blues guitarist, singer and songwriter, whose 50-year musical career in Illinois, New York, and California extended through various phases, including a highly regarded stint with Columbia Records in the early 1970s.

Early years (1960s and 1970s)
Born in Chicago, Illinois, United States, Raskin began using the performing name "Kal David" in his late teens as the frontman of his neighborhood band, Kal David and the Exceptions, formed in 1962. Its other members were Peter Cetera (bass, vocals), Denny Ebert (drums, vocals), and Marty Grebb (saxophone, keyboards, guitar, vocals). Cetera later joined the Big Thing, which became Chicago, and Grebb joined the Buckinghams. 
Around this time Kal David and the Exceptions were regular performers at the Interlude Club on Pulaski in Chicago.

Kal David left the group to sign a recording contract with King Records and, later, with Vee-Jay Records. In 1965, during his stint at Vee-Jay, he formed a new duo, The Rovin' Kind, with guitarist Paul Cotton, and the two transferred to Dunwich Records. Following a name change to Illinois Speed Press and a move to Los Angeles in 1968, the duo recorded two albums for Columbia, the self-titled Illinois Speed Press and Duet.

In the early 1970s, as Cotton joined the band Poco as its lead guitarist, David decided to leave the West Coast for the East and moved to Woodstock, the small-town/rural New York area, in the vicinity of previous year's iconic Festival. His new group, The Fabulous Rhinestones featuring ex-Electric Flag bassist Harvey Brooks and ex-Buckinghams' keyboard player Marty Grebb, recorded three albums: Fabulous Rhinestones, Freewheelin'  (on Paramount Records) and Rhinestones (on 20th Century Records). Friends advised him to visit a club in Woodstock and it was there that he met his future wife, vocalist Lauri Bono, who subsequently accompanied him back to Los Angeles for the next phase of their career, doing sidework for Etta James and Johnny Rivers.

Later phase (1980s through 2020s)
In the early 1980s, David played lead guitar for John Mayall on an album which would be released a decade later. Two albums for SoulCoast Records, Never a Dull Moment and Double Tuff each met with critical acclaim and worldwide record sales coupled with numerous television appearances, including a one-hour special featuring David in Germany.

At Hollywood's China Club, the Kal David Band headed up the weekly Pro-Jam which drew celebrity performers such as Stevie Wonder, Bobby Brown, John Entwistle, Larry Carlton, Brian Wilson, Stephen Stills, Joe Walsh and Paul Young, as well as blues musicians Sam Taylor and Floyd Dixon.

The early 1990s saw David and Bono move to Palm Springs, California, and form yet another band, Kal David and the Real Deal. This group featured both David and Bono on vocals, along with former Chaka Khan musical director Tony Patler on Hammond B-3 organ and drummer Alan Diaz, formerly with Sérgio Mendes. David tried local radio, hosting the late night "Blue Monday" blues show on Palm Springs soft rock station KEZN.

On July 14, 1998, the couple opened the Blue Guitar blues club above the Plaza Theatre in Palm Springs, which lasted six years, closing in 2004.

David and Bono continued to tour and frequently played at B.B. King's Blues Club in Los Angeles and the Mohegan Sun Resort and Casino in Connecticut.

David is the voice of 'Sonny Eclipse', a singing alien audio-animatronic, who resides at Cosmic Ray's Starlight Cafe at the Magic Kingdom in Walt Disney World. He did another performance for Disney World at Epcot, where he performed the "Unhealthy Living Blues" for the Goofy About Health exhibit at the Wonders of Life pavilion.

Kal David died on August 16, 2022, at the age of 79.

Honors
In 2004, a Golden Palm Star on the Palm Springs Walk of Stars was dedicated to Kal David and Lauri Bono.

Discography
 Paragon – Kal David and Lauri Bono (2018) Take That Task Records
 Living the Dream  – Kal David and Lauri Bono (2015) Crytone/CD Baby
 Kal David Band LIVE! – Kal David (featuring Miss Lauri Bono) (2015) Ari Records
 Crossroads of My Life – Kal David (2010) Crytone/CD Baby
 Live... At Blue Guitar... Last Call – Lauri Bono (featuring Kal David) (2006) Blue Guitar
 Live... At Blue Guitar... Last Call – Kal David (2006) Blue Guitar
 Live At Blue Guitar... By Request – Kal David and The Real Deal (2001) Blue Guitar
 Double Tuff- Kal David (1993) Soul Coast
 Never A Dull Moment – Kal David (1992) Soul Coast
 Cross Country Blues – John Mayall's Bluesbreakers (with Kal David, Don McMinn, Coco Montoya) [recorded 1981 and 1984] (1992) One Way 
 The Rhinestones – The Fabulous Rhinestones (Kal David, Harvey Brooks, Marty Grebb) (1975) Just Sunshine/20th Century
 Freewheelin' – The Fabulous Rhinestones (Kal David, Harvey Brooks, Marty Grebb) (1973) Just Sunshine/Paramount
 The Fabulous Rhinestones – The Fabulous Rhinestones (Kal David, Harvey Brooks, Marty Grebb) (1972) Just Sunshine/Paramount
 Vacuum Cleaner – Merryweather & Carey (Neil Merryweather and Lynn Carey) (1971) RCA
 Duet – Illinois Speed Press (Kal David and Paul Cotton) (1970) Columbia
 Illinois Speed Press – Illinois Speed Press (Kal David and Paul Cotton) (1969) Columbia
 Chhalia (original soundtrack recording) (features Kal David and others) (7" 45rpm EP release) (19??) Angel [India] Records
 "Can't Sit Down" b/w "You Turn Me On" – Barney Pip with The Rovin' Kind (7" single release) (1967) Smash Records
 "She" b/w "Didn't Want To Have To Do It" – The Rovin' Kind (Kal David and Paul Cotton) (7" single release) (1967) Dunwich Records
 "My Generation" b/w "Girl" – The Rovin' Kind (Kal David and Paul Cotton) (7" single release) (1966) Dunwich Records
 "Right On Time" b/w "Night People" – The Rovin' Kind (Kal David and Paul Cotton) (7" single release) (1966) Roulette Records
 "Everybody" b/w "Bound To Roam" – The Rovin' Kind (Kal David and Paul Cotton) (7" single release) (1965) Contrapoint Records
 "Come On Home" b/w "Dancin' Danny" – Kal David and The Exceptions (7" single release) (1965) Tollie Records [subsidiary of Vee-Jay]
 "Searchin'" b/w "Daydreaming Of You" – Kal David and The Exceptions (7" single release) (1964) Tollie Records [subsidiary of Vee-Jay]
 "Forgotten Dreams" b/w "Little Everyday Things" – Kal David and The Exceptions (7" single release) (1962) Ardore Records

Equipment
 1964 Gibson Firebird V 
 1963 (?) Gibson Firebird III Custom
 1998 Fender Vibroverb
 2000 Mesa Maverick Combo
 1955 Vintage Gibson Echoplex

References

External links

Kal David official website, tour schedule and discography
WDW Radio Interview
Kal David Interview – NAMM Oral History Library (2016)
 
 

1943 births
2022 deaths
American blues guitarists
American male guitarists
American male singers
Singers from Chicago
Songwriters from Illinois
John Mayall & the Bluesbreakers members
People from Woodstock, New York
Guitarists from Chicago
20th-century American guitarists